Johnson Jones Hooper (June 9, 1815 – June 7, 1862) was an American lawyer and writer from Alabama known for his humorist works set in what was then known as the Southwest of America, particularly the collection of stories published as Adventures of Captain Simon Suggs (1845). This gained him a national reputation. A secessionist, he was appointed in 1861 as secretary of the Provisional Confederate Congress and moved to Richmond, Virginia with it before his death from tuberculosis.

Biography
Hooper was born in Wilmington, North Carolina, as the youngest of three sons of Archibald Maclaine Hooper and Charlotte (de Bernier) Hooper. At the age of 20, he moved in 1835 to Dadeville, Alabama. There he edited a newspaper and practiced law, having been admitted to the bar after "reading the law". All told, he founded or edited six different publications during his career.

His first published work, in 1843, was a story, "Taking the Census in Alabama", drawn from his own experiences as a census taker in Tallapoosa County. In 1844 he began publishing short stories about a character known as Simon Suggs, which he collected and published in 1845 as the Adventures of Captain Simon Suggs. It was broadly, cruelly, and uncouthly humorous, yet one of the raciest books of its time, descriptive of a gambling sharp of what was then referred to as the Southwest in the "flush times." The work made him nationally known, and may have inspired one or more characters by Mark Twain. Hooper's Widow Rugby's Husband and Other Tales of Alabama (1851) was less successful.

Intensely political, Hooper supported secession of Alabama and other slave states, and in 1861 was appointed secretary of the Provisional Confederate Congress. He moved with the Confederate government to Richmond, Virginia, where he died from the effects of tuberculosis in 1862 (not 1861, as incorrectly indicated on the state historical marker). He was buried in that city's Shockoe Hill Cemetery. His grave was unmarked until 1950, when anonymous donors erected the current granite stone.

Hooper married Mary Mildred Brantley in 1845. They had two sons, William and Adolphus.

Legacy
Thomas A. Burke dedicated his book of humorous tales, Polly Peablossom's Wedding (1854), to Hooper.

David Handlin ranked Some Adventures of Captain Simon Suggs as number 9 in his article "One Hundred Best American Novels, 1770 to 1985" (2014).

Works
 Some Adventures of Captain Simon Suggs, Late of the Tallapoosa Volunteers. Philadelphia: Carey & Hart, 1845 (Rpt. as Adventures of Captain Simon Suggs, Late of the Tallapoosa Volunteers. Chapel Hill: University of North Carolina Press, 1969; Tuscaloosa, University of Alabama Press, 1993). 
 A Ride with Old Kit Kuncker, and Other Sketches, and Scenes of Alabama. Tuscaloosa: M. D. J. Slade, 1849 (Rpt. as The Widow Rugby's Husband. Philadelphia: A. Hart, 1851).
 Dog and Gun. New York: Orange Judd & Company, 1856 (Rpt. Tuscaloosa: University of Alabama Press, 1992).

Notes

Further reading
 Cymbalsky, Stephen (sic). 'Literature' in "Time, Talent, and Tradition: Five Essays on the Cultural History of the Lower Cape Fear Region", Edited by Janet K. Seapker.  Wilmington, NC, Museum of the Lower Cape Fear, 1995
 Hopkins, Robert (1963). "Simon Suggs: A Burlesque Campaign Biography," American Quarterly 15 (3), pp. 459–463.
 Inge, M. Thomas (2001). The Humor of the Old South. University Press of Kentucky.
 Phillips, Robert. L, Jr. (1987). "Johnson Jones Hooper (1815-1862)." In: Fifty Southern Writers Before 1900: A Bio-Bibliographical Sourcebook, edited by Robert Bain and Joseph M. Flora. Westport, Conn.: Greenwood Press.
 Sharp, Ann Wyatt (1986). "Some Adventures of Captain Simon Suggs: The Legacy of Johnson Jones Hooper." In: No Fairer Land: Studies in Southern Literature Before 1900, edited by J. Lasley Dameron and James W. Matthews. Troy, N.Y.: Whitson Publishing. 
 Shields, Johanna (1990). "A Sadder Simon Suggs: Freedom and Slavery in the Humor of Johnson Jones Hooper," Journal of Southern History 56, pp. 641–64.
 Williams, Benjamin Buford (1979). "Johnson Jones Hooper, 'Alias Simon Suggs'." In: A Literary History of Alabama: The Nineteenth Century. Rutherford, N.J.: Fairleigh Dickinson University Press, pp. 69–82.

External links
 Works by Johnson J. Hooper, at Hathi Trust
 Johnson Jones Hooper, Alabama Literary Map
 Historical Marker Database - Johnson J. Hooper

Writers from Wilmington, North Carolina
Writers from Alabama
Writers of American Southern literature
American humorists
1815 births
1862 deaths
19th-century American male writers
19th-century American short story writers
American male short story writers
19th-century deaths from tuberculosis
Tuberculosis deaths in Virginia
Members of the Confederate States House of Representatives